The Fiad is a right tributary of the river Sălăuța in Romania. It flows into the Sălăuța in the village Fiad.

References

Rivers of Romania
Rivers of Bistrița-Năsăud County